Sandra Barber is a house music singer from New York City who uses the stage name Sandy B.

Music career
She is primarily known for two of her solo records which reached #1 on Billboard's Dance/Club Play chart, "Make the World Go Round" and "Ain't No Need to Hide" in 1996, and 1997, respectively. Both songs were produced by the duo Deep Dish. Stonebridge (DJ) Onionz remixes of "Make the World Go Round" were also released.

In an unusual reversal of the conventional music industry success story, Sandy B had her #1 hits after leaving a major record label for an indie label. Though her two chart toppers were released on Champion Records, her debut #1 single "Feel Like Singin" had been released in 1992 on Nervous Records. She also released a single "Back Together" in 1994 on King Street Sounds.

After "Make the World Go Round" hit #1, Nervous included the David Morales remix of "Feel Like Singin" on the dance compilation album, 100% Pure Dance.

In 1998, Sandy B had an on-screen appearance in the movie Donnie Brasco, starring Al Pacino and Johnny Depp.

In 2000, and 2001, she had hits with singles released by the group Karmadelic, on which she performed the lead vocals. "Check It Out" reached #2 on the Hot Dance Music/Club Play, and "Nothingness" peaked at #10 on the Hot Dance Music/Club Play chart. Both songs secured moderate Rhythmic/Dance format airplay.

In 2003, she released a solo record "Lose Our Love" via the Junior Vasquez Music label, and it also saw the release of "Love Burns", written by Janice Robinson and produced by Stonebridge.

Recent times
In 2004, she contributed vocals to the song "Medicine" which was credited to DJ Mike Cruz Presents China Ro & Sandy B, on Nervous Records, featuring remixes by Dezrok.  The same year, she also released "The Beat Is Inside You", credited to DJ Exacta & Sandy B.

In 2005, Sandy co-wrote a song "Risen" with Janice Robinson, which went platinum in Belgium for the pop artist, Natalia. In 2006, her "Being True To Her Groove" was used in the Disney animation Kronk's New Groove.

In 2011, Sandy contributed vocals to the song "Party of the Year" which appears on the album Bandoozle by LGBTQ rapper Jipsta. The song was produced by Grammy nominated producer and remixer Chris Cox (DJ) and reached #10 on the Billboard Club Play chart.

Discography

Albums
 2003: Lose Our Love

Singles

See also
 List of number-one dance hits (United States)
 List of artists who reached number one on the US Dance chart

References

External links
 – Sandy B's Official Myspace

American soul singers
American dance musicians
American house musicians
Year of birth missing (living people)
Living people
American women in electronic music
21st-century American women singers
21st-century American singers